The men's 50 metre small-bore rifle, standing position was a shooting sports event held as part of the Shooting at the 1920 Summer Olympics programme. It was the third appearance of the event but the first time in the standing position. The competition was held on 2 August 1920. 50 shooters from 10 nations competed.

Results

The scores are only known for the shooters of the best four nations. The maximum score was 400. The scores of this event were summed to the result of the team small-bore rifle competition.

References

External links
 Official Report
 

Shooting at the 1920 Summer Olympics